A Tailor-Made Man is a 1922 American comedy silent film directed by Joe De Grasse and written by Albert Ray. The film stars Charles Ray, Tom Ricketts, Ethel Grandin, Victor Potel, Stanton Heck, Edythe Chapman, and Irene. The film was released on August 5, 1922, by United Artists. It is not known whether the film currently survives.

Plot summary

Cast 
 Charles Ray as John Paul Bart
 Tom Ricketts as Anton Huber 
 Ethel Grandin as Tanya Huber
 Victor Potel as Peter
 Stanton Heck as Abraham Nathan
 Edythe Chapman as Mrs. Nathan
 Irene as Miss Nathan 
 Frederick A. Thomson as Mr. Stanlaw 
 Kate Lester as Mrs. Stanlaw
 Jacqueline Logan as Corinne Stanlaw
 Frank Butler as Theodore Jellicot
 Douglas Gerrard as Gustavus Sonntag
 Nellie Peck Saunders as Kitty Dupuy
 Charlotte Pierce as Bessie Dupuy
 Thomas Jefferson as Gerald Whitcomb
 Henry A. Barrows as Hobart Sears 
 Eddie Gribbon as Russell
 Michael Dark as Cecil Armstrong
 Isabel Vernon as Mrs. Fitzmorris 
 Aileen Manning as Miss Shayn
 John McCallum as Butler
 William Parke Jr. as Rowlands
 Frederick Vroom as Harvey Benson
 Harold Howard as Arthur Arbuthnot
 S.J. Bingham as Cain
 Frederick Sullivan as Flynn

References

External links 

 
 
 
 

1922 films
American silent feature films
American black-and-white films
1920s English-language films
United Artists films
Films directed by Joseph De Grasse
Silent American comedy films
1922 comedy films
1920s American films